Events from the year 1939 in Sweden

Incumbents
 Monarch – Gustaf V
 Prime Minister – Per Albin Hansson

Events
31 August – The Sandö Bridge collapsed while under construction, and 18 workers were killed in the event.

 The secret intelligence agency C-byrån established.
 The Åhlinska skolan is closed.

Literature 
Pelle Svanslös på äventyr by Gösta Knutsson, the first book in the Pelle Svanslös children's book series

Births
 15 January – Per Ahlmark, writer and politician 
 25 January - Gabriel Romanus, politician 
 21 February - Börje Ahlstedt, actor 
 28 July – Gösta Ekman, actor, comedian, and director

Exact date missing 
 Ivar Jacobson, computer scientist and software engineer

Deaths

 12 January – Hugo Jahnke, gymnast (born 1886).
 16 May – Anders Lindstedt mathematician, astronomer and actuarial scientist, known for the Poincaré–Lindstedt method (born 1854)
 29 May – Åke Lundeberg, sport shooter (born 1888).
 18 December –  Bruno Liljefors, painter (born 1860)

Full date missing
Olof Olsson, politician (born 1872).

References

 
Sweden
Years of the 20th century in Sweden